Meikles is the popular name given to Meikles Hotel in central Harare, Zimbabwe, Meikles' department stores in Zimbabwe and Meikles Limited, the company which owns everything including the hotel, the department stores and Meikles' TM Supermarket chain and other retail outlets.

The company owns stock in Rebserve + Kingdom Financial Holdings.

The company was listed on the Zimbabwe Stock Exchange in 1996 and its market capitalization was ZW$6.3 trillion at the end of 2005. In November, 2019, Dubai-based Albwardy Investments stated that it will buy Zimbabwe’s Meikles Hotel for $20 million and would upgrade it.

History
In the late nineteenth century three brothers, John Meikle (1868-1949), Stewart Meikle and Thomas Meikle (1862-1939) emigrated from Strathaven,Scotland to South Africa. In 1892 the brothers opened a successful trading business in Fort Victoria in Victoria Province in Rhodesia. In 1915 Thomas Meikle opened a hotel in present-day Harare. Meikles had social and cultural prominence as the premier hotel in Harare.

Operations
Hotels

The company owns the Meikles Hotel, Cape Grace Hotel in Cape Town, South Africa and The Victoria Falls Hotel in Victoria Falls in a joint venture arrangement.

Retail

Meikles Africa Ltd owns several department stores in Zimbabwe operating as Meikles, Greatermans  and Barbours. The company operates the Zimbabwean franchise  for the South African Health and beauty retailer Clicks and also owns the TM Supermarket chain.

References

Sources
Bridger, P., House, M., and others, 1973. Encyclopaedia Rhodesia, College Press, Salisbury, Rhodesia.

External links
Meikles Annual Report 2011
Meikles Group/ Meikles Limited
The History of Thomas Meikle

Companies listed on the Zimbabwe Stock Exchange
Holding companies of Zimbabwe
Hospitality companies of Zimbabwe
1915 establishments in the British Empire
Hotels in Zimbabwe
Hotels in Harare